The subfamily Ovulinae, common name the ovulines, is a highly specialized, extant group of sea snails in the family Ovulidae. These are predatory or parasitic sea snails, marine gastropod mollusks within the superfamily Cypraeoidea. Species in this subfamily are sometimes referred to as cowries (singular: cowry or cowrie), although this name is commonly used for any member of the superfamily Cypraeoidea.

Description
Ovulinae typically have either an ovate (egg-shaped), lanceolate (lance-shaped) or pyriform (pear-shaped) shell. The spire is not prominent, and the funiculum is absent. The anal canal is twisted anteriorly. The extremities are usually short and the outer lip of the aperture has well-developed teeth. The mantle usually completely covers the shell in life. The mantle is typically brightly colored, while the shell is often white, although in some cases the shell is pink or even red. This can easily be seen in photographs of the snails.

Habitat
Ovulines live parasitically on anthozoans (of the phylum Cnidaria), feeding off of the exterior of the organism. In these cases, the ovuline species in question has almost always evolved a size, shape, and color that mimics the appearance of the cnidarians and camouflages itself with it. Alimentary homochromy, or the process of gaining the pigmentation of a host by feeding on the host, further helps to hide ovulines amongst their prey. Most members of the Ovulines live in tropical and subtropical waters.

Taxonomy
Species within the family Ovulidae have been reclassified numerous times throughout the 19th, 20th, and 21st centuries, and this has also affected the classification of the subfamily Ovulinae (Shilder 1932, Allan 1956, Cate 1973, Fehse 2001).  Historically, the Ovulids were separated into two subfamilies, Ovulinae and Volvinae, although this is no longer true. The taxonomy has changed often.

Bouchet & Rocroi (2005)
Bouchet and Rocroi (2005) present the following subfamilies of the family Ovulidae, of which Ovulinae is a subfamily.
Ovulinae Fleming, 1822
Cypraediinae Schilder, 1927
Jenneriinae Thiele, 1929
Pediculariinae Gray, 1853
Pseudocypraeinae Steadman & Cotton, 1943

Fehse (2007)
Fehse (2007) presents the following subfamilies of the family Ovulidae, of which Ovulinae is a subfamily.
Prionovolvinae Fehse, 2007
Simniinae Schilder, 1925
Ovulinae Fleming, 1828
Aclyvolvinae Fehse, 2007

At least one researcher suggests that there is still much work to be done is properly categorizing the taxonomy of the Ovulids in general, and the Ovulines in particular.

Genera
Genera within the Ovulinae include:
 Calcarovula C. N. Cate, 1973
 Kurodaovula Azuma, 1987
 Ovula Bruguière, 1789
 Pellasimnia Schilder, 1939
 Phenacovolva Iredale, 1930
 Takasagovolva Azuma, 1974
 Volva Röding, 1798
Genera brought into synonymy
 Amphiperas Herrmannsen, 1846: synonym of Ovula Bruguière, 1789
 Birostra Swainson, 1840: synonym of Volva Röding, 1798
 Birostris Fabricius, 1823: synonym of Volva Röding, 1798
 Ovulum G. B. Sowerby I, 1828: synonym of Ovula Bruguière, 1789 (invalid: unjustified emendation of Ovula)
 Parlicium Schilder, 1939: synonym of Ovula Bruguière, 1789
 Radius Montfort, 1810: synonym of Volva Röding, 1798
Primovula
Diminovula
Margovula
Calpurnus
Procalpurnus

References

Ovulidae